Band-e Chenar (also Romanized as Band-e Chenār and Band-i-Chenār) is a village in Fathabad Rural District, in the Central District of Khatam County, Yazd Province, Iran. At the 2006 census, its population was 20, in 6 families.

References 

Populated places in Khatam County